

Results of TTFA Events

Winners of TTFA Asian Championships (1952 - 1970)

Results of Individual Events 
The tables below are Asian Table Tennis Champions lists of individual events (Men's and Women's Singles, Men's and Women's Doubles and Mixed).

Men's singles

Women's singles

Men's doubles

Women's doubles

Mixed doubles

Results of Team Events 
The tables below are Asian Table Tennis Champions lists of teams events.

Men's team

Women's team

Results of ATTU Events

Winners of ATTU Asian Championships (1972 - Now)

Results of Individual Events 
The tables below are Asian Table Tennis Champions lists of individual events (Men's and Women's Singles, Men's and Women's Doubles and Mixed).

Men's singles

Women's singles

Men's doubles

Women's doubles

Mixed doubles

Results of Team Events 
The tables below are Asian Table Tennis Champions lists of teams events.

Men's team

Women's team

See also
Asian Table Tennis Championships

References

ITTF Statistics
ATTU Website

List
Lists of table tennis players
Lists of sports medalists

de:Tischtennis-Asienmeisterschaft
zh:亞洲桌球錦標賽